The Waverly Bridge is a bridge at Waverly, Missouri, carrying US 24/US 65 over the Missouri River between Carroll County and Lafayette County in the U.S. state of Missouri.

The previous bridge on this site was built in 1922.

The current bridge opened on August 25, 2004, and the previous bridge was demolished in 2005.

See also
List of bridges documented by the Historic American Engineering Record in Missouri
List of crossings of the Missouri River

References
Bridgehunter.com profile

External links

Buildings and structures in Carroll County, Missouri
Buildings and structures in Lafayette County, Missouri
Bridges over the Missouri River
U.S. Route 24
U.S. Route 65
Bridges of the United States Numbered Highway System
Historic American Engineering Record in Missouri
Road bridges in Missouri